Devils Branch is a stream in Buchanan County, Virginia and Pike County, Kentucky.

Devils Branch was named for Devil Anse Hatfield, a figure in the Hatfield–McCoy feud.

See also
List of rivers of Kentucky
List of rivers of Virginia

References

Rivers of Buchanan County, Virginia
Rivers of Pike County, Kentucky
Rivers of Kentucky
Rivers of Virginia